Tom Albanese (born ) was the former chief executive officer of the Vedanta Resources and was the former chief executive officer and a board member of the Rio Tinto Group. He was asked to resign from Rio Tinto on January 17, 2013 and was replaced by Sam Walsh. Albanese to stepped down as Vedanta CEO in August 2017.

Biography
Albanese was born in New Jersey and earned both a bachelor's degree in mineral economics and a master's in mining engineering from the University of Alaska Fairbanks.

Career
According to Forbes magazine, Albanese's total 2007 compensation was valued at $12,596,000. He has previously held several managerial positions within Rio Tinto's organization, including at North Limited and Kennecott Utah Copper.  Albanese joined the company in 1993, when Rio Tinto acquired his previous employer, NERCO. He has also served on the boards of Ivanhoe Mines (2006–07) and Palabora Mining Company (2004–06).

In March 2014 he became the CEO of London-based mining company Vedanta Resources.

References

Living people
1957 births
American mining businesspeople
People from New Jersey
American expatriates in Australia
University of Alaska Fairbanks alumni
People of Rio Tinto (corporation)
Australian mining entrepreneurs